Quercus tardifolia, the Chisos Mountains oak or lateleaf oak, is a rare North American species of oak. It has been found in the Chisos Mountains inside Big Bend National Park in Texas, and in the nearby Sierra del Carmen across the Río Grande in northern Coahuila.

Quercus tardifolia is an evergreen tree with gray bark and reddish-brown twigs.

Conservation
This species was thought to be extinct, however in May 25, 2022 a remaining specimen was found.

Etymology 
The common name Chisos Mountains oak refers to the Chisos Mountains range where the species was discovered.

References

External links
Wildscreen Arkive, Chisos Mountains oak (Quercus tardifolia) — photo of herbarium specimen.
Conabio Naturalista, Quercus tardifolia — photo of live specimen.

tardifolia
Endemic flora of Texas
Flora of Coahuila
Flora of the Rio Grande valleys
Big Bend National Park
Plants described in 1936
Critically endangered flora of North America
Critically endangered biota of Mexico
Critically endangered flora of the United States
Taxonomy articles created by Polbot